William Lang Denholm McCue OBE (1934–1999) was a Scottish singer known for his performances in opera, musical theatre and traditional Scottish folk music. Bill was born in Allanton on 17 August 1934. In 1982 he was awarded an OBE for his contribution to Scottish music. In 1999 he died aged 65.

References

1999 deaths
Year of birth missing
20th-century Scottish male singers
Officers of the Order of the British Empire